David Catlin-Birch is a British musician. He was a bass guitarist for pop/alternative rock band World Party, and was the original "Paul" for the March 1980 launch of The Beatles tribute band, The Bootleg Beatles.

With Rowland Rivron and Richard Vranch, he made up the core team for BBC Radio 2's musical comedy show Jammin' which won a Silver Sony Comedy Award in 2004. He played bass guitar with The Flight of the Conchords on their 2005 Radio 2 series. In 2006, he joined Neil Innes and the Bonzo Dog Doo-Dah Band for their UK tour as lead guitarist, taking lead vocals for a handful of songs and recording as a member of the band on its first album in 36 years, Pour l'Amour des Chiens.

As a session guitarist, bass guitarist, vocalist, drummer and keyboard player, he has performed with Eurythmics, Stevie Wonder, Ringo Starr, Joe Cocker and Robbie Williams. He also briefly wrote with the late Viv Stanshall from the Bonzo Dog Doo-Dah Band. In November 2002, he performed with Jim Lea, the former bass guitarist of Slade, at his one-off "Jim Jam" gig at the Robin 2 club in Wolverhampton when Lea played lead guitar.

References

British pop pianists
British male guitarists
British rock bass guitarists
British pop singers
British rock singers
Living people
World Party members
The Bootleg Beatles members
British male pianists
Male bass guitarists
21st-century pianists
21st-century British male musicians
Year of birth missing (living people)